Transport in the Dominican Republic utilizes a system of roads, airports, ports, harbours, and an urban railway.

Roadways 

Five main highways (DR-1, DR-2, DR-3, DR-4, DR-5) connect the Dominican Republic's biggest cities and tourist centers; they are in good condition. Like any underdeveloped nation, the Dominican Republic suffers from a lack of good paved roads to connect smaller towns and less populated areas, though work on paving them proceeds; major town roads are kept in good condition.

Public transportation

Mass transit 
The Santo Domingo Metro is the first mass transit system in the country, and the second among Caribbean & Central American nations. It is the most extensive metro system in the region by length and total number of stations. On February 27, 2008, the incumbent president Leonel Fernández test-rode the system for the first time, and thereafter free service was offered several times. Commercial service began on January 30, 2009. Several additional lines are currently planned.

Santiago Light Rail is a planned light rail system, still at the development stage, in the Dominican Republic's second-largest city Santiago de los Caballeros; its construction was once slated to begin in mid-2008 but is currently on hold, due to lack of approval and of central government funds.

Buses

The Dominican Republic has a bus system that is rather reliable, and most of these public transportation vehicles are fairly comfortable. The fare is generally inexpensive, and there are bus terminals and stops in most of the island's major cities.

Public Cars (Carros Públicos)
The Public Cars (Carros Públicos–Conchos) are privately owned passenger cars that transit a specific route daily and passengers pay a certain fee with the convenience of stopping anywhere. This comprises one of the main ways of transportation inside the capital city of Santo Domingo, as well as other major cities. This system, though, is not very reliable and lacks discipline. The high number of public cars that travel the roads, and the fact that they do not lend themselves to regulation or central control, causes frequent transit problems among city roads. They may also be somewhat uncomfortable, since they try to fit as many people as possible inside them. As a standard, a four-person sedan (driver included) usually carries six passengers, twice the amount for which they were designed.

Railways 

Rail operations are provided by one state-owned operator and several private operators (mainly for sugar mills):
 Central Romana Railroad was established in 1911 in the sugarcane fields.
 The Dominican Republic Government Railway (United Dominican Railways or Ferrocarriles Unidos Dominicanos) was a   narrow gauge railway.
 There are no connections with Haiti.

Ports and harbors 
Major ports and harbours in the Dominican Republic:

Ports

The Port of Santo Domingo, with its location in the Caribbean, is well suited for flexible itinerary planning and has excellent support, road, and airport infrastructure within the Santo Domingo region, which facilitate access and transfers. The port is suitable for both turnaround and transit calls.
Haina Occidental Port, located just 20 km west of Santo Domingo, is one of the most important ports in the Dominican Republic. About 70% of all cargo, excluding Caucedo and free zone exports/imports, is moved through this port.
DP World's terminal Multimodal Caucedo Port maritime terminal and logistic center operates under the Free Zone Regime. Actually 85% of Free Zone exports to the United States is shipped from Caucedo terminal. Multimodal Caucedo port is also able to act as a trans-shipment hub to the Caribbean and Latin America for Asia specifically Japan as a door to the American market.
Port of Puerto Plata is the main commercial port on the north coast of the Dominican Republic.
Port of Boca Chica is located about 20 miles east of the capital city and five miles from the International airport Las Americas. Currently the port is almost exclusively used for containers and some lumber, newsprint and homogeneous cargoes.
Port of San Pedro de Macoris is located on the Higuamo river. This port is mainly used to discharge bulk fertilizer. Cement clinker, coal, wheat, diesel and LPG. It is also used to export sugar and molasses produced by several sugar cane mills in the region.
Central Romana Port, located in La Romana, belong to Central Romana Corporation which is a private company established in 1911 and has the largest sugar mill in the country.

The following six local ports are a single pier with berth facility:

Cayo Levantado Port or (Arroyo Barruk/Puerto Duarte) is located in the Samaná Bay.
Manzanillo Port is located very close to the Haitian border.
Port of Cabo Rojo is located in Cabo Rojo, southeast to the border.
Port of Barahona is located in Barahona, in the bay of Neyba.
Port of Azua in Azua, also called Puerto Viejo is located at Ocoa Bay.
Palenque Port is located southwest of Santo Domingo.

A local ferry service runs daily between the Samaná and Sabana del Mar ports.

Merchant marine
Total:
1 ship (1,000 GT or over) totaling 1,587 GT/
Ships by type:
cargo 1 (1999 est.)

Entering the ports
Boaters and sailors who wish to dock in any of the Dominican Republic's ports must follow certain entry requirements: 
 Upon approaching the port, ships must display a quarantine flag, which has the letter 'Q' on it, and wait for admittance into the port.
 The passengers of the vessel must pay a fee, get a tourist card, and show proper identification including a valid passport.
 Military officials must sometimes grant the passengers clearance to come ashore.

Airports 

In 2009, there were seven major and 31 minor airports in the Dominican Republic. The major ones were:
 Las Américas International Airport, Santo Domingo City, Santo Domingo
 Punta Cana International Airport, Punta Cana / Higüey
 Cibao International Airport, Santiago City, Santiago
 Gregorio Luperón International Airport, Puerto Plata
 La Romana International Airport, La Romana City, La Romana
 Samana El Catey International Airport, Sanchez, Samana
 María Montez International Airport, Barahona City, Barahona

Airports - with paved runways
Total: 10 (1999 est.)
Over 3,047 m:      3
2,438 to 3,047 m:  1
1,524 to 2,437 m:  4
914 to 1,523 m:    3
under 913 m:       2

Airports - with unpaved runways
Total: 15 (1999 est.)
1,524 to 2,437 m:  2
914 to 1,523 m:    4
under 914 m:       9

National airlines
 Dominicana de Aviación was once the country's national airline for a large period of time. This title was passed on to various other companies after Dominicana stopped flying.
 After Dominicana de Aviación ceased, PAWA Dominicana became the flag carrier of the country in 2015. However, flights were suspended in January 2018.

Flights 
There are direct flights to and from the Dominican Republic from the United States, Cuba, Canada, Mexico, Venezuela, Colombia, Argentina, Brazil, Europe and the Caribbean.

See also 
 Dominican Republic
 Puerto Plata Airport

References

External links 

 Dominican Republic - Ministry of Tourism, Official Site
 Santo Domingo Public Transportation
 Dominican Republic Information Pictures of transportation